The sod house or soddy was an often used alternative to the log cabin during frontier settlement of the Great Plains of Canada and the United States in the 1800s and early 1900s. Primarily used at first for animal shelters, corrals, and fences, if the prairie lacked standard building materials such as wood or stone, or the poverty of the settlers precluded purchasing standard building materials, sod from  thickly-rooted prairie grass was abundant, free, and could be used for house construction. Prairie grass has a much thicker, tougher root structure than a modern lawn. 

Construction of a sod house involved cutting patches of sod in triangles and piling them into walls. Builders employed a variety of roofing methods. Sod houses accommodated normal doors and windows. The resulting structure featured less expensive materials, and was quicker to build than a wood-frame house, but required frequent maintenance and were often vulnerable to rain damage, especially if the roof was also primarily of sod. Stucco was sometimes used to protect the outer walls. Canvas or stucco often lined the interior walls. There are a variety of designs, including a type built by Mennonites in Prussia, Russia, and Canada called a semlin, and a variety in Alaska known as a barabara.

Notable sod houses

Sod houses that are individually notable and historic sites that include one or more sod houses or other sod structures include:

Iceland
Skagafjordur Folk Museum, turf/sod houses of the burstabær style in Glaumbær.
Arbaer Folk Museum.
Canada
Addison Sod House, a Canadian National Historic Landmark building, in Saskatchewan.
L'Anse aux Meadows, the site of the pioneering 10th–11th century CE Norse settlement near the northern tip of Newfoundland, has reconstructions of eight sod houses in their original locations, used for various purposes when built by Norse settlers there a millennium ago.
The Mennonite Heritage Village in Steinbach,  Manitoba contains a Mennonite-style sod hut known as a semlin

United States
Cottonwood Ranch, Sheridan County, Kansas. The ranch site, listed in the National Register of Historic Places (NRHP), included a sod stable.
Dowse Sod House, near Comstock, Nebraska; NRHP-listed and operated as museum.
Heman Gibbs Farmstead, Falcon Heights, Minnesota; the NRHP-listed site includes a replica of the original 1849 sod house.
Jackson-Einspahr Sod House, Holstein, Nebraska, NRHP-listed.
Leffingwell Camp Site, Flaxman Island, Alaska, listed on the U.S. National Register of Historic Places (NRHP).
Minor Sod House, McDonald, Kansas, NRHP-listed.
Page Soddy, Harper County, Oklahoma, NRHP-listed.
Pioneer Sod House, Wheat Ridge, Colorado, NRHP-listed.
Gustav Rohrich Sod House, Bellwood, Nebraska, NRHP-listed.
Sod House (Cleo Springs, Oklahoma), also known as Marshall McCully Sod House, NRHP-listed.
Sod House Ranch, Burns, Oregon (does not include a sod house).
Wallace W. Waterman Sod House, Big Springs, Nebraska, NRHP-listed.

See also

 Burdei
 Canadian Prairies
 Dugout (shelter)
 Earth structure
 Icelandic turf houses
 Rammed earth
 Sod roof
 Vernacular architecture

References

Further reading

Two books by Solomon D. Butcher (1856–1927), Nebraska photographer of the homestead era, whose works include over 1,000 photos of sod houses: Pioneer History of Custer County and Short Sketches of Early Days in Nebraska (1901), and Sod Houses, or the Development of the Great American Plains (1904)

American frontier
House types
 
Western (genre) staples and terminology

is:Torfbær